Galvão, Galvao, &c. is a Portuguese surname derived from Latin Galbanus and Galba. 

Notable people with this surname include:

Sportspeople
André Galvão (born 1982), Brazilian mixed martial artist
André Galvão (futsal player) (born 1992), Portuguese futsal player
Antonio Dino Galvão (1901–????), Brazilian footballer
Diego Benedito Galvão Máximo (born 1986), Brazilian footballer
Diogo Galvão (born 1982), Brazilian footballer
Douglas Galvão Silva (born 1986), Brazilian footballer
José Antônio Martins Galvão (born 1982), Brazilian footballer
Lucas Galvão (born 1991), Brazilian footballer
Marcos Galvão (born 1981), Brazilian mixed martial artist
Mário Galvão (1916–?), Portuguese footballer
Martim Galvão (born 1995), Portuguese footballer
Mauricio Galvao (1890–1945), German field hockey player
Mauro Galvão (born 1961), Brazilian footballer and manager
Pedro Galvão (born 1934), Argentine swimmer
Pedro Galvão (footballer) (born 1984), Portuguese footballer
Raulino Galvao (1888–?), German hockey player
Rodrigo Andreis Galvão (born 1978), Brazilian footballer
Tiago Galvão da Silva (born 1989), Brazilian footballer
Vinicius Galvão Leal (born 1989), Brazilian footballer
Washington Galvão Júnior (born 1989), Brazilian footballer

Other fields
António Galvão (–1557), Portuguese soldier and historian
Cândido da Fonseca Galvão (1845–1890), Brazilian military officer
Carlos Galvão de Melo (1921–2008), Portuguese military officer
Duarte Galvão ( – 1517), Portuguese diplomat
Eduardo Galvão (1962–2020), Brazilian actor
Filipe Galvão, known as Fiuk (born 1990), Brazilian actor and singer
Flávio Galvão (born 1949), Brazilian actor
Frei Galvão (1739–1822), Brazilian Franciscan friar and saint
Henrique Galvão (1895–1970), Portuguese politician and writer
Lula Galvão (born 1962), Brazilian musician
Marcos Galvão (diplomat) (born 1959), Brazilian diplomat
Patrícia Rehder Galvão, known as Pagu (1910–1962), Brazilian writer
Paulo Galvão (born 1967), Portuguese musician
Ricardo Galvão (born 1947), Brazilian physicist and engineer
Sofia Galvão (born 1963), Portuguese lawyer and politician

See also
 Galvan (Spanish) and Galvano and Galvani (Italian)
 Estádio Conselheiro Galvão